Arthrobacter ginkgonis is a Gram-positive and aerobic bacterium from the genus of Arthrobacter which has been isolated from rhizosphere soil from the tree Ginkgo biloba in Dandong, China.

References

External links
Type strain of Arthrobacter ginkgonis at BacDive -  the Bacterial Diversity Metadatabase

Bacteria described in 2017
Micrococcaceae